The Advisory Council on Youth (AC;) is a non-governmental youth constituency of the Council of Europe. It is a crucial part of the unique co-management structure, a living example of participatory democracy, where young Europeans together with the European Steering Committee for Youth (CDEJ), the body of the representatives of Youth ministries from the 50 States Parties to the European Cultural Convention, equally decide on the standards and work priorities of the Council of Europe's youth sector in the Joint Council on Youth (CMJ).

History
With the establishment of the European Youth Centre (EYC) in Strasbourg in 1972 and the European Youth Foundation (EYF) in 1973, youth participation and co-managing became a core value of the organisation.

In 1988, with a reform of the Youth Sector of the Council of Europe, as a follow-up action of the First Conference of European Ministers responsible for Youth in Strasbourg in 1985, which had stressed the need to promote participation of the young at all levels of society, the Advisory Committee to the European Youth Centre and the European Youth Foundation was established at the same time as the European Steering Committee for Youth (CDEJ). The Ministers' Deputies agreed, that this Advisory Committee will replace the non-governmental Governing Boards of the European Youth Foundation and of the European Youth Centre as a single structure. The Advisory Committee was admitted to send one observer to the CDEJ and the two newly established bodies were meeting annually in an enlarged General Meeting from this point on.

The co-managed structure in its current form, with an Advisory Council on Youth and a Joint Council on Youth, was established in 1998 by the Committee of Ministers of the Council of Europe at their 650th meeting with the reform of the Youth Sector of the Council of Europe, which was implemented as from 1 January 1999. In its beginning the Advisory Council was also called Advisory Council of the European Youth Centre and European Youth Foundation as well as Advisory Council on Youth Questions.

Between 2003 and 2011 the Advisory Council's terms of reference designated its members for a mandate of three years.

Core values
Next to democracy and inclusion, the core value of the co-management structure is youth participation, as it is in the work and philosophy of the Council of Europe a goal, a principle and a practice at the same time. Its specific task is the mainstreaming of youth policies in the Council of Europe programme of activities by formulating opinions and proposals on general or specific questions concerning youth in the Council of Europe.

Thematically the work of the Advisory Council on Youth contributes to the priorities of the Council of Europe's Youth Sector, namely Access to rights, Youth participation and Inclusive societies, as well as by setting and promoting standards and developing recommendations and other texts. Currently the promotion of the implementation in member states of the most recent recommendations on Protecting youth civil society and young people  (2022), young refugees (2019), on youth work (2017), on access to rights (2016) and on access to social rights (2015) is on a high agenda.

The unique participatory co-management structure in the field of youth, received the 2019 Future Policy Award in Bronze at a ceremony on the margins of the 141st Assembly of the Inter-Parliamentary Union in Belgrade.

Procedures

The Advisory Council on Youth comprises in total 30 young representatives designated by the Committee of Ministers for a two-year mandate, including 13 young people of international non-governmental youth organisations (INGYOs) and seven representatives of National Youth Councils, on the proposal of the European Youth Forum, as well as ten members, representing non-governmental youth organisations or networks, which are not members of the European Youth Forum on the proposal of the Secretary General of the Council of Europe. The 20 representatives on the proposal of the European Youth Forum gets democratically elected among its member organisations, usually at its spring Council of Members (COMEM) in Brussels.

The Advisory Council on Youth holds two meetings every year, usually one in spring at the European Youth Centre in Budapest and one in autumn at the European Youth Centre in Strasbourg.

The Programming Committee on Youth (CPJ), composed of eight members each from the CDEJ and the AC, establishes, monitors and evaluates the programmes of the European Youth Centres and of the European Youth Foundation. It takes the decisions on all applications submitted to the EYF as well as on the study sessions organised in co-operation with the European Youth Centres.

At the first meeting of every two-year mandate, the Advisory Council elects its leadership out of its members, a so-called Bureau consisting of a Chairperson, a vice-chairperson and three additional members with the overall task to guide the Advisory Council on Youth politically.

Chairpersons

External links 

 Advisory Council on Youth at the website of the Council of Europe
 Terms of reference of the Advisory Council on Youth (PDF; 292 KB)
 2014 Info leaflet of the Advisory Council on Youth (PDF; 2.2 MB)

References 

Advisory Council on Youth
European Union youth policy
Advisory Council on Youth